Loricaria thuyoides is a terrestrial shrub in the high Andes.

Distribution
Colombia, Ecuador.

References

External links
 

thuyoides